Thomas Robert Ardolino (January 12, 1955 – January 6, 2012) was an American rock drummer best known as a member of NRBQ (New Rhythm and Blues Quartet).

Biography
Tom Ardolino was born and raised in Springfield, Massachusetts.  A fan of the band, he began corresponding and trading tapes with keyboardist and co-founder Terry Adams. This led to him meeting and befriending the band.  At one live show, when original NRBQ drummer Tom Staley did not return for an encore, Adams invited Ardolino to fill in.  He performed well enough that when Staley left the band in 1974, his bandmates agreed that Ardolino was the natural choice as successor.

Ardolino remained in the lineup until the band went on hiatus in 2004, returning for occasional performances with Adams, and contributing to solo recordings by Adams (Rhythm Spell and Holy Tweet), by NRBQ (Keep This Love Going and We Travel the Spaceways) and others (see Selected Discography).

While lead vocals were generally performed by other members of NRBQ, live shows often included a moment where Ardolino would take the spotlight and sing, either with a karaoke backing track or with one of the other band members drumming.

Ardolino's solo album Unknown Brain was released in 2004 on CD by Bumble Bee Records, Japan and on vinyl LP in the USA on Mystra Records. The album consists mostly of basement recordings made in 1971–72. The cover states "WARNING: If out-of-tuneness bothers you, do not listen."

He was also an avid collector of song poems, and initiated the "MSR Madness" series of compilations.
 
Ardolino appeared in a promotional video to campaign for the world premiere of The Simpsons Movie in his hometown of Springfield.

Tom Ardolino died on January 6, 2012, at a Springfield, Massachusetts, hospital; this was reported on the NRBQ Headquarters page on Facebook. A later article from the Washington Post specified the cause as diabetes.

Selected Discography
All Hopped Up (Red Rooster Records) 1978
At Yankee Stadium (Mercury Records) 1978
Kick Me Hard (Red Rooster Records) 1979
Tiddlywinks (Red Rooster Records) 1980
NRBQ in Person! (Red Rooster Records) 1982
Grooves in Orbit (Bearsville Records) 1983 
Tapdancin' Bats (Red Rooster Records) 1983
She Sings, They Play (Red Rooster Records) 1985, with Skeeter Davis
Christmas Wish (Rounder Records) 1985
Lou & the Q (Red Rooster Records) 1986, with Lou Albano
Uncommon Denominators (Rounder Records) 1986
God Bless Us All (Rounder Records) 1987 
Through the Eyes of a Quartet (Demon Music Group) 1987
Diggin’ Uncle Q (Rounder Records) 1988
Truth or Consequences (Amigo-Sweden) 1988
Wild Weekend (Virgin Records) 1989
Peek-A-Boo, The Best of NRBQ 1969-89 (Rhino Entertainment) 1990
Honest Dollar (Rykodisc) 1992
Stormalong (Rabbit Ears/BMG Kidz) 1992, with John Candy
Message for the Mess Age (Rhino Entertainment) 1992
Tokyo (Dreamsville – Japan) 1996
Christmas Wish (Big Notes) 1996
Tokyo (Rounder Records) 1997
You’re Nice People, You Are (Rounder Records) 1997
You Gotta Be Loose (Rounder Records) 1997
NRBQ (Rounder Records) 1999
Ridin’ in My Car (Rounder Records) 1999
Christmas Wish – Extended Edition (Dreamsville – Japan) 2000
Atsa My Band (Edisun) 2002
Music’s Been Good to You (Edisun) 2007
Live from Mountain Stage (Blue Plate) 2002
Live at the Wax Museum (Edisun) 2003, with John Sebastian
Transmissions (Caraway-Japan) 2004
Froggy’s Favorites (Clang) 2006
Christmas Wish – Deluxe Edition (Clang!) 2007
Keep This Love Going (Clang!) 2011
We Travel the Spaceways (Clang!) 2012
With Terry Adams
Terrible (New World Records) 1995
Rhythm Spell (Clang!) 2007
Holy Tweet (Clang!) 2009
With Steve Ferguson
Mama U-Seapa (Schoolkids Records) 1995

With Terry Adams and Steve Ferguson

 Louisville Sluggers (Clang!) 2006

With PJ O’Connell
Happy Go Lucky (Edisun) 2002
Careful (Clang!) 2006
With Johnny Johnson
Johnnie B. Bad (Elektra Records) 1991
With Hot Shots
Teen Street (Clang! – US and Vivid Sound Corporation - Japan) 2008
With Neanderthals
The Modern Stone-Age Family (Sundazed Records) 1999
With Jim Stephanson
Say Go (Clang!) 2010
With Instant Cytron
Little Gang Of The Universe (Dreamsville Records) 2000
Solo:
Unknown Brain (Bumblebee Records) 2004
As Producer/Presenter
The Beat of the Traps:  MSR Madness Vol 1 (Carnage Press) 1992
The Makers of Smooth Music:  MSR Madness Vol 2 (Carnage Press) 2007
Off The Charts: The Song Poem Story Various artists (Red Rock Records - film soundtrack)

Video/Film/TV
Derbytown (Recorded Live in Louisville, 1982, MVD Visual)
One in a Million (Recorded Live in Montreal, 1989, MVD Visual)
Saturday Night with Connie Chung (band profile, CBS, 1989)
Complex World, (director Jim Wolpaw, 1992)
Take My Wife, Sleaze, episode 234 of The Simpsons, first broadcast November 28, 1999
Off the Charts: The Song Poem Story (director Jamie Meltzer, 2003)
NRBQ: Rock & Roll's Best-Kept Secret (produced by Mike Scully and Julie Thacker, first broadcast on A&E (TV channel)'s Breakfast with the Arts on January 26, 2003
Live in Performance (SRO Entertainment, 2006)

References

1955 births
2012 deaths
musicians from Springfield, Massachusetts
American rock drummers
NRBQ members
The Minus 5 members